Vivek Ranjan Agnihotri (born 10 November 1973) is an Indian film director, film producer, screenwriter and author who works in Hindi cinema. , he is a member of the board of India's Central Board of Film Certification and a cultural representative of Indian Cinema at the Indian Council for Cultural Relations. 

Agnihotri made his directorial debut with the crime thriller Chocolate (2005) and has directed multiple films since which failed to propel his career forward until The Tashkent Files (2019) which emerged as a commercial success and earned him the National Film Award for Best Screenplay - Dialogues. He also wrote and directed The Kashmir Files (2022) which emerged as one of the highest-grossing Indian film of 2022

Early life and education 
Agnihotri was born in Gwalior Madhya Pradesh He studied at the Indian Institute of Mass Communication before enrolling at Harvard Extension School for a Certificate of Special Studies in Administration and Management. In interviews with media, he has also mentioned Bhopal School of Social Sciences and Jawaharlal Nehru University among his almae matres.

Career

Advertising and television serials 
Agnihotri started his career with the advertising agencies Ogilvy and McCann, and served as creative director for campaigns of Gillette and Coca-Cola. In 1994, he became involved with the directing and production of several television serials; his work was positively received. In 2018, Agnihotri claimed that had received threats for using the name Mohammad in his short film Mohammad and Urvashi.

Filmmaking 
Agnihotri debuted in Bollywood with Chocolate (2005), a remake of the 1995 Hollywood neo-noir crime thriller The Usual Suspects. Critical reception of the movie was negative, and the film fared poorly at box office. In 2018, Bollywood actress Tanushree Dutta would accuse Agnihotri of inappropriate behaviour during its filming. He allegedly asked her to strip and dance to give expression cues to her male co-star Irrfan Khan during a close-up shot and retreated only after Irrfan and Suniel Shetty rebuffed him. Agnihotri denied the allegations as "false and frivolous", and filed a defamation case against Dutta. Sattyajit Gazmer, the film's assistant director, also disputed Tanushree's allegations.

Dhan Dhana Dhan Goal is about an all-Asian football team in the United Kingdom that wins trophies while fighting on-field discrimination and the local municipality that wants to sell the team's ground. It received poor reception from critics and did "average" business at the box office. Hate Story received mixed critical reception and fared moderately at the box office. Buddha in a Traffic Jam featured his wife Pallavi and premiered at Mumbai International Film Festival in 2014; it was received unfavourably by critics and severely under-performed at the box office. Junooniyat was also subject to poor reviews and fared similarly.

Agnihotri's 2014 erotic thriller Zid received poor reviews but did average business at the box office. However, Agnihotri has since claimed that credit for direction and screenplay was wrongly attributed to him, and that he was not involved with the film. The Tashkent Files became a sleeper box-office hit and won National Film Awards. In March 2022, Agnihotri released The Kashmir Files on the exodus of Kashmiri Hindus; the film has become a blockbuster hit. Shortly after the release of the film, he was provided Y-category security detail across the country by the Ministry of Home Affairs based on inputs from the Intelligence Bureau.

Agnihotri has said that his upcoming film, The Delhi Files, will be the last in the Files trilogy, which is "evidently about the 1984 anti-Sikh riots." In November 2022, he announced another upcoming film The Vaccine War to be released on 15 August 2023, on the Indian independence day. The film supposedly portrays the development of a domestic vaccine for COVID-19 pandemic in India.

Film certification 
In 2017, Agnihotri was selected as convenor by the Ministry of Information and Broadcasting in the preview committee of 48th International Film Festival of India. The same year, he was selected as member on board of India's Central Board of Film Certification.

ICCR 
On 15 September 2020, Agnihotri was appointed as cultural representative at Indian Council for Cultural Relations. He would represent Indian Cinema at ICCR.

Urban Naxals 
In 2018, Agnihotri wrote Urban Naxals: The Making of Buddha in a Traffic Jam, in which he described individuals in academia and media who were allegedly colluding with Naxalites in a bid to overthrow the Indian government and were thus "invisible enemies of India" as "Urban Naxals".

Critics said the term is "vague rhetoric" that is designed to discredit intellectuals who are critical of the establishment and political right and to stifle dissent. Reviews in the Organiser and The New Indian Express had praised the work. The Union Minister of Human Resource Development Smriti Irani endorsed Agnihotri's views of Jadavpur University and Jawaharlal Nehru University for having refused to screen Buddha in a Traffic Jam.

National Kishore Kumar Award 
In 2022, Agnihotri has received the National Kishore Kumar Samman.

Personal life 
Agnihotri married Indian actress Pallavi Joshi in 1997 and has two children. He has described himself as a supporter of Narendra Modi, but not of the Bharatiya Janata Party that Modi belongs to. Agnihotri supports cannabis legalization.

In 2022, Agnihotri announced that he was starting knee surgery after suffering a cartilage tear the previous year, which resulted in him suffering a stress fracture. He had ignored the cartilage tear for one and half years while producing The Kashmir Files.

In 2022, Agnihotri delivered a speech in the Parliament of the United Kingdom. The theme of the event was "India, world peace and humanism".

Controversies 
Fact checkers have noted Agnihotri to have shared misleading content from his Twitter account. In September 2018, Agnihotri tweeted a listicle claiming that a survey from the BBC found that the Indian National Congress was the second most corrupt party in the world. The survey was fake and an online editor writing for the BBC said that they have never conducted such surveys. In November 2018, Agnihotri tweeted a misleading video that appeared to show that Indian political activist Kanhaiya Kumar had converted to Islam. According to Boom Fact Check, the video was "a compilation of three separate clips which have taken Kanhaiya's statements out of context from the entire speech." In March 2019, Agnihotri falsely claimed that former Indian Prime Minister Jawaharlal Nehru was responsible for the outcome of the Indo-Pakistani War of 1965. Nehru had previously died in May 1964 and Lal Bahadur Shastri was Prime Minister during the war. In January 2020, Agnihotri tweeted a doctored image of an anti-Citizenship Amendment Act (CAA) protester that he claimed was real. In February 2020, Agnihotri falsely claimed that cannabis kills COVID-19.

In September 2018, Twitter locked his account until he agreed to delete a tweet denigrating Swara Bhaskar. In response to Swara calling out politician P. C. George, who called an alleged rape victim a prostitute, Vivek tweeted "Where is the placard - '#MeTooProstituteNun'?". The tweet was interpreted as calling Swara a prostitute. Agnihotri defended his tweet and said he was making a point about the placarding by liberals at selective instances of alleged perpetrators belonging to the Hindu community.

Filmography

Bibliography

Accolades

Best Screenplay (Dialogues) at the 67th National Film Awards: The Tashkent Files.
Best Writer and Director at Jakarta International Film Festival: Buddha in a Traffic Jam.

Notes

References

External links

Hindi-language film directors
Living people
21st-century Indian film directors
Kendriya Vidyalaya alumni
Film directors from Madhya Pradesh
People from Gwalior
1973 births
Harvard Extension School alumni